Elections to the Baseball Hall of Fame for 1986 followed the system in place since 1978. 
The Baseball Writers' Association of America (BBWAA) voted by mail to select from recent major league players and 
elected Willie McCovey. The Veterans Committee met in closed sessions to consider older major league players as well as managers, umpires, executives, and figures from the Negro leagues. It selected two players, Bobby Doerr and Ernie Lombardi. A formal induction ceremony was held in Cooperstown, New York, on August 3, 1986, with Commissioner of Baseball Peter Ueberroth, and former Commissioners Bowie Kuhn and Happy Chandler, in attendance.

BBWAA election
The BBWAA was authorized to elect players active in 1966 or later, but not after 1980; the ballot included candidates from the 1985 ballot who received at least 5% of the vote but were not elected, along with selected players, chosen by a screening committee, whose last appearance was in 1980. All 10-year members of the BBWAA were eligible to vote.

Voters were instructed to cast votes for up to 10 candidates; any candidate receiving votes on at least 75% of the ballots would be honored with induction to the Hall. The ballot consisted of 41 players; a total of 425 ballots were cast, with 319 votes required for election. A total of 2,992 individual votes were cast, an average of 7.04 per ballot. (This would prove to be the last election to average 7 or more votes per ballot until 2014.) Those candidates receiving less than 5% of the vote will not appear on future BBWAA ballots, but may eventually be considered by the Veterans Committee.

Candidates who were eligible for the first time are indicated here with a dagger (†). The one candidate who received at least 75% of the vote and was elected is indicated in bold italics; candidates who have since been elected in subsequent elections are indicated in italics. The 17 candidates who received less than 5% of the vote, thus becoming ineligible for future BBWAA consideration, are indicated with an asterisk (*).

The newly-eligible players included 15 All-Stars, two of whom were not included on the ballot, representing a total of 36 All-Star selections. Among the new candidates were 7-time All-Star Minnie Miñoso, who was re-eligible due to two at-bats in 1980, and 6-time All Star Willie McCovey. The field included one MVP (McCovey), and two Rookies of the Year (McCovey and Ted Sizemore).

Players eligible for the first time who were not included on the ballot were: Bill Bonham, Pedro Borbón, Bernie Carbo, Ralph Garr, Ken Henderson, Von Joshua, Fred Kendall, Lerrin LaGrow, Skip Lockwood, Elliott Maddox, Roger Metzger, Fred Norman, Marty Pattin, Dave Rader, Merv Rettenmund, Jim Rooker, Ted Sizemore and Bob Stinson.

J. G. Taylor Spink Award 
Earl Lawson (1923–2003) received the J. G. Taylor Spink Award honoring a baseball writer. The award was voted at the December 1985 meeting of the BBWAA, and included in the summer 1986 ceremonies.

References

External links
1986 Election at www.baseballhalloffame.org

Baseball Hall of Fame balloting
Hall of Fame balloting